Dmitry Vashkel (born 3 January 1993) is a Belarusian footballer playing currently for Maxline.

References

External links
 
 
 Profile at Naftan website

1993 births
Living people
Belarusian footballers
Association football midfielders
FC Naftan Novopolotsk players
FC Volna Pinsk players
FC Khimik Svetlogorsk players
FC Lokomotiv Gomel players
FC Ostrovets players
FC Dnepr Rogachev players